The Masarh lion is a stone sculpture found at Masarh, a village near Arrah town in the Bhojpur district in the Indian state of Bihar. This sculpture is generally dated to the 3rd century B.C.

Description
The lion is carved out of Chunar sandstone, similar to the Pillars of Ashoka, and has a polished finish, a feature associated with Maurya sculpture. The sculptural style is Achaemenid. This is particularly the case for the well-ordered tubular representation of whiskers (vibrissae) and the geometrical representation of inflated veins that cover the face. The mane, with tufts of hair represented in wavelets, is classically represented.

According to archaeologist S.P. Gupta, these visual features can be described as non-Indian. Similar examples are known in Greece and Persepolis. It is possible that this sculpture was made by an Achaemenid or Greek sculptor in India and either remained without effect, or was the Indian imitation of a Greek or Achaemenid model, somewhere between the 5th century B.C. and the 1st century B.C. However, it is generally dated from the time of the Maurya Empire, around the 3rd century B.C.

 Achaemenid Examples

 Greek Examples

Later developments
According to John Boardman, the sculpture is "quite Persian", although the treatment of the mane is of Greek naturalistic style and breaks with the rigid and codified style of the Achaemenid Empire. The Lion Capital of Ashoka from Sarnath represents the next logical step in the art, and would be the realisation of Greek Hellenistic artists to soften and give more naturalness to the Persian style.

Other examples of stylistic influence
Other examples include the Pataliputra capital, the Hellenistic friezes of the Rampurva capitals and Sankissa, and the diamond throne of Bodh Gaya.

See also

 Hellenistic influence on Indian art

References

External links
 A similar lion at Ecbatana
 West Asian Influence on Lion Motifs in Mauryan Art, Vinay Kumar
 Journal of Multidisciplinary Studies in Archaeology 5 (2017): 433‐444 Lion Motif in Mauryan Art: Indigenous or Foreign? Vinay Kumar

Stone sculptures
Sculptures from Bihar
Sculptures of lions
Mauryan art